Arthur Lesieur Desaulniers (February 9, 1873 – July 16, 1954) was a merchant and political figure in Quebec. He represented Champlain in the House of Commons of Canada from 1917 to 1930 as a Liberal.

He was born in Louiseville, Quebec, the son of Alexis Lesieur Desaulniers and Oliva Pichette. In 1896, he married Hélène Gariépy. He was mayor of Sainte-Anne-de-la-Pérade from 1913 to 1919 and was warden for Champlain County in 1917. Desaulniers was defeated by Jean-Louis Baribeau when he ran for reelection in 1930. He died in Sainte-Anne-de-la-Pérade at the age of 81.

References 

1873 births
1954 deaths
Liberal Party of Canada MPs
Mayors of places in Quebec
Members of the House of Commons of Canada from Quebec
People from Louiseville